Samuel Maclure (11 April 1860 – 8 August 1929) was a Canadian architect in British Columbia, Canada, from 1890 to 1920. He was born on 11 April 1860 in Sapperton, New Westminster, British Columbia, to John and Martha Maclure. He studied painting at the Spring Garden Institute in Philadelphia from 1884 to 1885, and he was a self-taught architect. He married Margaret Catherine (Daisy) Simpson, an accomplished pianist and portrait painter, on 10 August 1889.

Career

In 1889, he formed an architectural partnership in New Westminster in association with Charles H. Clow, and then with Richard P. Sharp. In 1892, Maclure moved to Victoria, British Columbia. From 1897 to 1899, he formed an architectural partnership with John Edmeston Parr in Vancouver. From 1905 to 1916, he formed an architectural partnership in Vancouver with Cecil Croker Fox. 

Maclure and his wife Daisy were founding members of the Vancouver Island Arts and Crafts Society in 1909. In 1920, the Vancouver office reopened under Maclure's former apprentice, Ross A. Lort, who continued the practice after Maclure's death on 8 August 1929 in Victoria, following a prostate operation.

Notable commissions

Maclure was responsible for over 450 commissions in British Columbia. His first commission, the Temple building for merchant Robert Ward, reflects the Chicago School style.

He was known for Tudorbethan architecture, the American Craftsman Style and, after 1912, Edwardian classicism. His gardens reflected the aesthetic of the English Arts and Crafts Movement. He was a consultant to the Butchart Gardens near Victoria.

According to Maclure biographer Janet Bingham, the  architect is also known to have created houses in the United States, but only one is extant - Ramsay House in Ellensburg, WA - an Arts & Crafts style bungalow with Tudor finishes that has changed hands only three times since construction finished in 1905.

Legacy
His paintings are found in the Art Gallery of Greater Victoria and in the Maltwood Art Museum and Gallery, University of Victoria. His architectural plans and drawings are held in the University of Victoria Architecture and Special Coll., SC075 (Samuel Maclure fonds).

See also
List of heritage buildings in Vancouver

References

Bibliography

External links
Historic Places in Canada

1860 births
1923 deaths
Canadian architects
People from New Westminster